Lecithocera fuscosa is a moth in the family Lecithoceridae first described by Kyu-Tek Park in 1999. It is found in Taiwan.

The wingspan is 15–16 mm. The forewings are heavily covered with dark, blackish scales throughout. The hindwings are dark grey.

Etymology
The species name is derived from the Latin fuscus (meaning black) and refers to the blackish forewing.

References

Moths described in 1999
fuscosa